The UAAP Season 70 volleyball tournaments opened December 1, 2007 and ended March 2, 2008. The tournament host is University of the Philippines. Tournament games were held at the Ateneo de Manila Blue Eagle Gym, Rizal Memorial Coliseum, Ninoy Aquino Stadium and University of the East Gymnasium.

Men's tournament

Elimination round

Team standings

Schedule

Playoffs

First-seed playoff

Semi-finals

UST vs. AdU

|-
!colspan=10|UST advances to the Finals

FEU vs. UP

|-
!colspan=10|FEU advances to the Finals

Finals

|-
!colspan=10|UST wins series 2–1

Awards
* Most Valuable Player: 
 Rookie of the Year: 
 Best Scorer: 
 Best Attacker: 
 Best Blocker: 
 Best Setter: 
 Best Server: 
 Best Receiver: 
 Best Digger:

Women's tournament

Elimination round

Team standings

Schedule

Playoffs

Second–seed playoff

First–seed playoff

Semifinals

FEU vs. UST

|-
!colspan=10|FEU advances to the Finals

Adamson vs. Ateneo

|-
!colspan=10|Adamson advances to the Finals

Finals

|-
!colspan=10|FEU wins series 2–1

Awards
* Most Valuable Player:  
 Rookie of the Year:  
 Best Scorer: 
 Best Attacker:  
 Best Blocker:  
 Best Setter: 
 Best Server:  
 Best Receiver: 
 Best Digger:

References

2007 in Philippine sport
2008 in Philippine sport
UAAP Season 70
UAAP volleyball tournaments